Furnace was an unincorporated community in Hardy County, West Virginia, United States.

References 

Unincorporated communities in West Virginia
Unincorporated communities in Hardy County, West Virginia